PCAE may refer to:
Perpich Center for Arts Education
Peterborough College of Adult Education, which became the City College of Peterborough in 2010